Vinita may refer to:

People 
Vinita Bali (born 1955), Indian businesswoman, Managing Director of Britannia Industries
Vinita Gupta (born 1969), Indian-born American businesswoman, founder of Digital Link Corporation
Vinita Joshi, Indian television actress
Vinita Nair (born 1981), American television journalist
Vinita Vasu (born 1975), Indian artist

Places 
Ayodhya, also known as Vinita, an Indian city in Uttar Pradesh
Vinita, Oklahoma, an American city in Craig County
Vinita Formation, a geological formation in Coquimbo, Chile
Vinita Park, Missouri, an American city in St. Louis County
Vinita Terrace, Missouri, an American village in St. Louis County

See also 
 Binita
 Vineeta (disambiguation)